Nosratabad Rural District may refer to:

Nosratabad Rural District (Qazvin Province)
Nosratabad Rural District (Sistan and Baluchestan Province)